The Hallo-Wiener is a children's book by Dav Pilkey. It was published in 1995 by The Blue Sky Press. The story's main character is Oscar the dachshund, named after Oscar Mayer.

Plot
The story begins with Oscar, a dachshund who is half-a-dog tall and one-and-a-half dogs long, and tired of the other dogs making fun of him because of his wiener-shaped body. He is happy because it is Halloween, and he cannot wait to get a costume. At obedience school, he daydreams of Halloween. When he comes home from school his mother has a surprise for him: a hot dog bun with mustard in the middle and Oscar is supposed to fit in the middle. He thought he would get laughed at, but wears the costume anyway, because he does not want to hurt his mom's feelings. He sees the other dogs showing off their costumes and when they see Oscar's costume they howl in laughter.

Oscar's costume is so heavy that it slows him down. Meanwhile, the dogs are getting their paws on all the candy and when Oscar comes to the houses there are no more treats left. The dogs go to a graveyard and they hear a noise, scream very loud and run, diving into a river because they see a scary monster. When Oscar comes to see the monster he notices something strange. He bites the cover of the monster, pulls it off with all his might, and discovers two cats hiding underneath. The cats scream and run away. Then Oscar jumps into the water and uses his costume as a life raft, and rescues the other dogs. The dogs thank Oscar by sharing their candy with him. They become friends forever and Oscar is never made fun of again, for he is then known as "Hero Sandwich".
Oscar also makes an appearance in one of Dav's other books, called Captain Underpants and the Perilous Plot of Professor Poopypants.

References
1. Pilkey, Dav. The Hallo-Wiener. New York, NY: The Blue Sky Press, 1995. Print. .

1995 children's books
American picture books
Works by Dav Pilkey
Fictional dogs
Halloween children's books
Blue Sky Press books